Chhattisgarh Text Book Corporation is an agency of Government of Chhattisgarh, India. It is engaged in publishing,  printing, distributing school textbooks. It was set up in 2004 and has its headquarters in Raipur.

References

Education in Chhattisgarh
State agencies of Chhattisgarh
Book publishing companies of India